Thiago Rodrigues da Silva (born 6 January 1996), commonly known as Mosquito, is a Brazilian footballer who plays as a forward for Lampang.

Club career
Born in Rio de Janeiro, Mosquito joined Vasco da Gama's youth setup in 2009, but left the club in 2011 due to unpaid wages. On 4 May 2012 he agreed a deal with São Paulo, but the deal was declared void only five days later.

Mosquito joined Atlético Paranaense on 29 October 2012, but was not allowed to play until February of the following year. He made his senior debut on 2 February 2014, starting and scoring his side's only in a 1–2 away loss against Rio Branco for the Campeonato Paranaense championship; it was his maiden appearance of the competition.

Mosquito made his Série A debut on 20 April 2014, playing the last 16 minutes of a 1–0 home win against Grêmio. He scored his first professional goal on the 27th, netting his side's first of a 2–2 away draw against Vitória.

On 20 February 2015, after being released by Furacão, Mosquito returned to his first club Vasco, signing a short-term deal. He was excluded from the first team in July, after only appearing in two matches.

On 14 August 2015 Mosquito moved abroad for the first time in his career, after agreeing  with Spanish Segunda División side UE Llagostera. He made his debut for the club on 22 August, replacing Chumbi in a 0–2 home loss against CA Osasuna.

Arsenal de Sarandí
Mosquito signed a two-year contract with Arsenal de Sarandí in mid-2017.

Honours
Brazil U20
Toulon Tournament: 2014

References

External links
Atlético Paranaense profile 

1996 births
Living people
Footballers from Rio de Janeiro (city)
Brazilian footballers
Association football forwards
Campeonato Brasileiro Série A players
Club Athletico Paranaense players
CR Vasco da Gama players
Boavista Sport Club players
Deportivo Maldonado players
Segunda División players
UE Costa Brava players
Argentine Primera División players
Arsenal de Sarandí footballers
Najran SC players
Saudi First Division League players
Brazil youth international footballers
Brazil under-20 international footballers
Brazilian expatriate footballers
Brazilian expatriate sportspeople in Spain
Expatriate footballers in Spain
Expatriate footballers in Argentina
Expatriate footballers in Saudi Arabia
Brazilian expatriate sportspeople in Saudi Arabia